East Burra (Old Norse: "Barrey") is one of the Scalloway Islands, a subgroup of the Shetland Islands in Scotland. It is connected by a bridge to West Burra.

With an area of  it is the twelfth largest of the Shetland Islands.

East Burra has a much smaller population than West Burra and no substantial settlement; rather, there are a few hamlets and a scattering of individual croft houses.  It is known for its Neolithic remains including a burnt mound, and for sea caves.  The roofless, plain, Old Haa (manor or laird's house) of Houss is a prominent feature.  From Houss, it is possible to walk the two kilometres or so to the cliffs at the southern end of the island.  From there, the island of South Havra, nowadays home only to sheep and seabirds, can be clearly seen.

East Burra is linked to the Shetland Mainland via West Burra and Trondra by a series of bridges.

Etymology
Collins Encyclopedia of Scotland suggests that the name "Burra" is a corruption of "Borgarey" (island of the broch), and while this is unlikely, and no broch is extant, the place name Brough, on West Burra lends some support to this case. However, the form used in the Orkneyinga saga is "Barrey".

References

Islands of Shetland
Scalloway Islands